Matha is a variant of the name Maitiú, an Irish form of Matthew.

People with the name 
Matha Mág Tighearnán (fl. 1290–1311), Baron or Lord of Tullyhunco barony, County Cavan
Matha Óg Ó Maoil Tuile (17th century), secretary to Rudhraighe Ó Domhnaill, 1st Earl of Tyrconnell and Hugh Ó Neill, 2nd Earl of Tyrone
 Matha mac Úmóir, one of the druids of the Tuatha Dé Danann according to Irish legend

See also
 Maitiú
 Matthew

References

Irish-language masculine given names